Aayisha is a 1964 Indian Malayalam-language film, directed and produced by Kunchacko. The film stars Prem Nazir, Sathyan, Sheela and Sasirekha. The film had musical score by R. K. Shekhar.

Cast
 
Prem Nazir as Basheer 
Sathyan as Abubacker Sahib 
Sheela as Amina 
Sasirekha as Ayisha 
Manavalan Joseph as Haque 
Sankaradi as Rehman 
Jijo as Alimon 
Adoor Pankajam as Beeyaathu 
Bahadoor as Moideen 
K. S. Gopinath as Abu Sayyad 
Nanukkuttan as Uppaappa 
Pankajavalli as Paathumma 
S. P. Pillai as Abdhu 
Vijaya Kumari as Suhara

Soundtrack
The music was composed by R. K. Shekhar and the lyrics were written by Vayalar Ramavarma and Moinkutty Vaidyar.

References

External links
 

1964 films
1960s Malayalam-language films